The 1998 Harrow Borough Council election took place on 7 May 1998 to elect members of Harrow London Borough Council in London, England. The whole council was up for election and the Labour Party gained overall control of the council.

Background

Election result

Ward results

References

1998
1998 London Borough council elections